Arve can refer to:

People
 Given name
Arve Johnsen, politician
Arve Henriksen, trumpet player
Arve Isdal, guitarist
Arve Moen Bergset, folk music performer
Arve Opsahl, actor and comedian
Arve Tellefsen, violinist
Arve Walde, footballer

 Surname
 Minna Arve, Finnish politician

Rivers
Arve, Arve River, France
Arve River (Tasmania)

Norwegian masculine given names